In enzymology, a cholestanetetraol 26-dehydrogenase is an enzyme that catalyzes the chemical reaction

(25R)-5beta-cholestane-3alpha,7alpha,12alpha,26-tetraol + NAD+  (25R)-3alpha,7alpha,12alpha-trihydroxy-5beta-cholestan-26-al + NADH + H+

Thus, the two substrates of this enzyme are (25R)-5beta-cholestane-3alpha,7alpha,12alpha,26-tetraol and NAD+, whereas its 3 products are (25R)-3alpha,7alpha,12alpha-trihydroxy-5beta-cholestan-26-al, NADH, and H+.

This enzyme belongs to the family of oxidoreductases, specifically those acting on the CH-OH group of donor with NAD+ or NADP+ as acceptor. The systematic name of this enzyme class is (25R)-5beta-cholestane-3alpha,7alpha,12alpha,26-tetraol:NAD+ 26-oxidoreductase. Other names in common use include cholestanetetrol 26-dehydrogenase, 5beta-cholestane-3alpha,7alpha,12alpha,26-tetrol dehydrogenase, TEHC-NAD oxidoreductase, 5beta-cholestane-3alpha,7alpha,12alpha,26-tetraol:NAD+, and 26-oxidoreductase.  This enzyme participates in bile acid biosynthesis.

References

 

EC 1.1.1
NADH-dependent enzymes
Enzymes of unknown structure